The plain-backed sunskink (Lampropholis couperi) is a species of skink, a lizard in the family Scincidae. The species is endemic to Queensland in Australia.

Etymology
The specific name, couperi, is in honor of Australian herpetologist Patrick J. Couper.

Habitat
The preferred natural habitat of L. couperi is forest.

Reproduction
L. couperi, is oviparous.

References

Further reading
Cogger HG (2014). Reptiles and Amphibians of Australia, Seventh Edition. Clayton, Victoria, Australia: CSIRO Publishing. xxx + 1,033 pp. .
Ingram GJ (1991). "Five new skinks from Queensland rainforests". Memoirs of the Queensland Museum 30 (3): 443–453. (Lampropholis couperi, new species, p. 450).
Wilson S, Swan G (2013). A Complete Guide to Reptiles of Australia, Fourth Edition. Sydney: New Holland Publishers. 522 pp. .

Skinks of Australia
Endemic fauna of Australia
Reptiles described in 1991
Lampropholis
Taxa named by Glen Joseph Ingram